St Peter and St Paul's Church is a Grade I listed parish church in the Church of England in Old Brampton, Brampton, North East Derbyshire.

History

The porch of the church dates from the 12th century, but is mostly 14th century.

A restoration was carried out in 1868 when the roofs of the nave and south aisles were renewed, along with the walls of the clerestories. The floor was lowered to its original level and all of the windows were reglazed with ‘cathedral’ glass. The tower was opened to the church and provided with seating. The belfry staircase was built inside the church, and the masonry was cleaned. A new vestry was built at the same time. The restoration cost £1,000 and was undertaken by a local builder, Mr. Marriott of Staveley.

In 1924 the bells were recast, and a new burial ground was consecrated by the Bishop of Southwell, Sir Edwyn Hoskyns, 12th Baronet

Organ
 
The organ dates is by Brindley & Foster and dates from 1882. It was opened on 6 December 1882 by Henry Norman Biggin, Organist of the Church of St Mary and All Saints, Chesterfield.

A specification of the organ can be found on the National Pipe Organ Register.

Parish status

The church is in a joint parish with: 
St Lawrence's Church, Great Barlow
Cutthorpe Institute, Cutthorpe

See also
Grade I listed churches in Derbyshire
Listed buildings in Brampton, North East Derbyshire

References

Church of England church buildings in Derbyshire
Grade I listed churches in Derbyshire
North East Derbyshire District